Birodi Chhoti (also known as Bidodi Chhoti or Beerodi Chhoti) is a village within the Laxmangarh administrative region of Sikar district, Rajasthan, India. Bidodi chhoti (small) borders Khinwasar, Bidsar, Bidasar, Birodi Badi, Jhareva, Jogiyon ka bas, and Brahmino ki Dhani (Ramsingh Pura) and Malio Ki Dhani villages.

The  village has an overall population of about 1,430 of whom most are Jat ethnic group, while the main gotra of the village are Bhaskar, Godara, and Lodha. Other castes include Brahmin, and Harijan.

Transportation
Birodi is connected by a two lane asphalt road to Laxmangarh and Nawalgarh. Nawalgarh Railway station,  from Birodi is the nearest railway station, which is  well connected to Jaipur, Delhi and other cities.

There is a road between Nawalgarh and Birodi chhoti. Asphalt roads connect the village to surrounding villages and to Laxmangarh. Camel carts and bullock carts were formerly the chief means of transportation and are being replaced by motorcycles and other automobiles. Quite a few villagers walk to Nawalgarh and other surrounding places. In the rainy season, womenfolk can be seen bringing grass on their heads for cows and buffaloes.

References

External links
 Google map view of the Birodi Chhoti
 Details of Sarpanch in Sikar
 List of all villages of Rajasthan with their Panchayat Samiti
 Voter List of Birodi Bari Panchayat
 Sikar District Official Web Page
 List of all the land records

Villages in Sikar district